is a Japanese poet, novelist, essayist and translator.

He draws upon the relationship between civilization and nature in his writing, among other themes. Ikezawa translates a wide variety of writing, from contemporary Greek poetry to modern novels, and translates American literature into the Japanese language. He is also the father of voice actress Haruna Ikezawa.

Since 2011 he has been the editor-in-chief of the literary magazine Bungei.

Bibliography 
English translations
 Still Lives (tr. Dennis Keene, Tokyo: Kodansha International, 1997)
 A burden of flowers (tr. Alfred Birnbaum, Tokyo: Kodansha International, 2001)
 On a Small Bridge in Iraq (tr. Alfred Birnbaum, Okinawa: Impala, 2003)
 The Navidad Incident: The Downfall of Matías Guili (Haikasoru/VIZ Media, 2012), translation of Masiasu Giri no shikkyaku (マシアス・ギリの失脚) (1993)

References

External links 
 Impala—Official web site
 The A Team (Words Without Borders, tr. Alfred Birnbaum, from Ikezawa Natsuki. ‘Asteroid no Kansokutai (アステロイドの観測隊)’, Switch Vol. 11, No. 3, Tokyo: Switch Publishing, 1993.7)
 Natsuki Ikezawa at J'Lit Books from Japan 
 Synopsis of A Burden of Flowers (Hana o Hakobu Imoto) at JLPP (Japanese Literature Publishing Project) 

1945 births
Living people
Japanese expatriates in Greece
Japanese expatriates in France
Japanese translators
Japanese essayists
Japanese poets
20th-century Japanese novelists
21st-century Japanese novelists
English–Japanese translators
French–Japanese translators
Magic realism writers
Akutagawa Prize winners
Writers from Hokkaido
People from Obihiro, Hokkaido
20th-century essayists
21st-century essayists